The Men's 1982 World Amateur Boxing Championships were held in Munich, West Germany from May 4 to 15. The third edition of this competition, held two years before the Summer Olympics in Los Angeles, California, was organised by the world governing body for amateur boxing AIBA.

Medal table

Medal winners

External links 
Results on Amateur Boxing

World Amateur Boxing Championships
AIBA World Boxing Championships
B
Boxing Championships
Sports competitions in Munich
International boxing competitions hosted by Germany
1980s in Munich
World Amateur Boxing Championships